Castle Rotondo is a fortress castle in Kaštel Štafilić, Croatia, on the Adriatic coast. It was fully constructed in 1508, on the order of Stefano Štafileo, a Trogirian nobleman. Stafileo ordered its construction in 1508 to protect his lands and the Kozjak's peasants from the Ottomans pillaging. It is situated by a beautiful sea cliff.

Parallel to the castle, there is a fortified renaissance house, where there is the Stafileo's family crest, engraved with a bunch of grapes. The grapes are a visual translation of the Štafileo name, which means bunch of grapes in Greek. The crest symbolizes wine making, and the future. There is also an inscription in Latin above the castle gate, which states the original purpose behind the Castle's construction. The southern residential wing of the house has a water gate that still exists today.

Origin of the name
Castle Rotondo is named after the noble family, 'Rotondo' that resided in it for over 400 years. Prior to this, it was 'Castle Štafileo'.

History

The first owner, and builder, Stefano Štafileo arrived from Crete, Greece, and married a woman from Trogir. He became a well-respected resident of Trogir with houses and residences all over town.

Stefano's son  was Bishop of the diocese of Sibenik, Archdiacon in Trogir, a doctor in law, lecturer in Rome, the papal legate, diplomat, Croatian Latinist, and later, Polish nobility.

Ivan was a diplomat to Pope Leo X, handled the divorce of King Henry VIII of England, and Catherine of Aragon. Was baptized by the French king Francis I in 1519. The King of Poland, Sigismund I the Old, gave Ivan a title, and a priceless painting. The painting can be found today in the church of Kaštel Štafilić.

Function

The Castle functioned as a Fortress, where it protected villagers from invading Turkish occupiers.

Size
The Castle has an area of 1,127 m2, with a ground floor, and three higher floors,

References

Castles in Croatia
Buildings and structures in Split-Dalmatia County